Moussoumourou is a town in the Tiéfora Department of Comoé Province in South-Western Burkina Faso. The town has a rough population of 1,108.

References

Populated places in the Cascades Region
Comoé Province